Haupt is a German surname. Notable bearers include:
 Christopher Lehmann-Haupt (1934–2018), American journalist, editor, critic, and novelist
 Enid A. Haupt (1906–2005), American publisher and philanthropist
 Georg Haupt (1741–1784), Swedish cabinet maker
 Georges Haupt (1928–1978), historian of socialism
 Greg Haupt, a former guitarist of American rock band Story of the Year
 Herbert Haupt (born 1947), Austrian politician
 Herman Haupt (1817–1905), American civil engineer and railroad construction engineer
 Hermann Haupt (1873–1959), German entomologist
 Kurt Haupt (born 1989), South African-born German international rugby union player
 Moritz Haupt (1808–1874), German philologist
 Paul Haupt (1858–1926), German Assyriologist
 Zygmunt Haupt (1907–1975), Polish writer and painter
 Ullrich Haupt, Sr. (1887–1931), German film actor
 Ullrich Haupt, Jr. (1915–1991), his son, also a German actor
 Zoe Hauptová (1929–2012), Czech Slavicist and chief editor of the Old Church Slavonic Dictionary

See also
 Haupt (mountain), Obwalden, Germany
 Enid A. Haupt Glass Garden
 Hauptman
 Hauptmann (disambHauptmann (disambiguation)iguation)

German-language surnames
Surnames from nicknames